Reims-Maison-Blanche (French: Gare de Reims-Maison-Blanche) is a railway station in the city of Reims, Marne department, northern France. The station is located in the La Maison Blanche neighbourhood of the city. It is situated at kilometric point (KP) 168.524 on the Épernay-Reims railway and served by TER Grand Est trains operated by the SNCF.

History 
The station was renovated between 2006 and 2007 in preparation for the arrival of the TGV East European.

In 2018, the SNCF estimated that 60,440 passengers passed through the station.

Train services 

 Regional services (TER Grand Est C9) Épernay ... Champagne-Ardenne TGV ... Reims.

References 

Railway stations in Marne (department)
Transport in Reims
Buildings and structures in Reims